Michel Édouard Levie (Binche,  4 October 1851 - Saint-Josse-ten-Noode, 6 March 1939) was a Belgian politician and member of the Catholic Party. He was a doctor of law, and also practiced as a lawyer.

Levie was a member of the Chamber of Representatives from 1900 until 1921; Minister of Finance between 1911 and 1914. He was made Minister of State on 21 November 1918.

A square (Square Levie-Levieplein) in Schaerbeek, Brussels is named in his honour.

External links 
 Michel Levie in ODIS - Online Database for Intermediary Structures

1851 births
1939 deaths
Catholic Party (Belgium) politicians
19th-century Belgian lawyers
People from Binche
Finance ministers of Belgium
Belgian Ministers of State
Catholic University of Leuven (1834–1968) alumni